Leonard Francis "Mike" O'Brien (January 20, 1904 – March 30, 1939) was an American field hockey player who competed in the 1932 Summer Olympics and 1936 Summer Olympics.

He was born in North Adams, Massachusetts and died in Boston, Massachusetts.

In 1932 he was a member of the American field hockey team, which won the bronze medal. He played one match as back.

Four years later he was a member of the American field hockey team, which lost all three matches in the preliminary round and did not advance. He played three matches as back.

External links
 
profile

1904 births
1939 deaths
American male field hockey players
Field hockey players at the 1932 Summer Olympics
Field hockey players at the 1936 Summer Olympics
Olympic bronze medalists for the United States in field hockey
People from North Adams, Massachusetts
Medalists at the 1932 Summer Olympics
Sportspeople from Berkshire County, Massachusetts